Centralia Township is one of ten townships in Boone County, Missouri, USA.  As of the 2012, its population was 4,674. The township is dominated by the railroad city of Centralia for which it is named.

History
Centralia Township was established in 1874.

Geography

The township contains one incorporated settlement: Centralia. Though the township primarily drains into the Missouri River the extreme northern part drains into the Mississippi River via the Salt River.

References

External links
 City-Data.com

Townships in Boone County, Missouri
Townships in Missouri